is a railway station located in the city of Ishinomaki, Miyagi Prefecture, Japan, operated by East Japan Railway Company (JR East).

Lines
Kakeyama Station is served by the Ishinomaki Line, and is located 17.1 kilometers from the terminus of the line at Kogota Station.

Station layout
The station has one side platform serving a single bi-directional track. The station is unattended.

History
Kakeyama Station opened on October 28, 1912. The station was absorbed into the JR East network upon the privatization of Japanese National Railways (JNR) on April 1, 1987. Operations of the line and the station were suspended by the 2011 Tōhoku earthquake and tsunami of March 11, 2011. Services were resumed on March 17, 2013.

Surrounding area
Ishinomaki City East Kannan Junior High School
Miyagi Prefectural Highway 257

See also
 List of railway stations in Japan

External links

  

Railway stations in Miyagi Prefecture
Ishinomaki Line
Railway stations in Japan opened in 1912
Ishinomaki
Stations of East Japan Railway Company